Pyrenochaeta terrestris is a fungal plant pathogen infecting maize, sweet potatoes and strawberries. This plant pathogen causes a disease in onion (Allium cepa) that is commonly called Pink Root. This fungus is also known to infect  shallot, garlic, leek and chive, cantaloupe,  carrot, cauliflower,  corn, cowpea,  cucumber, eggplant,  lima bean,  millet, vats, peas, peppers, potato, spinach, sugarcane and tomato. 

This fungus produces dark brown to black pycnidia that have setae with one to five septa and are 8-120 µm long. Setae mostly occur around the ostiole, but may grow anywhere on the pycnidium. Pycnidiospores are hyaline, oblong - ovoid, biguttulate, and sessile in the pycnidium and ooze from ruptures or through the ostiole. The mycelium formed bythis fungus is septate, branching, and hyaline. If this fungus is grown on wheat straw or cellulose it produces a pink pigment that is a prominent characteristic of the disease this pathogen causes. This pathogen also produces several toxins.

Host Range and Distribution

Pyrenochaeta terrestris has been documented as a widespread saprophyte and a weak parasite to a lot of hosts. The biggest losses caused by this disease are usually from a disease complex including the species Fusarium, Pithium, Rhizoctonia and Helminthosporium. "In 1941 it was reported to survive on soybean, pea, cane, millet, oats, barley, wheat, corn, squash, cucumber, cantaloupe, muskmelon, tomato, pepper eggplant, cauliflower, carrot, spinach, and onion with reports of high disease to no disease damage". This pathogen is adapted to many climates such as temperate, sub-temperate, and tropical; due to its ability to survive in a broad range of pH, temperatures, and soil types.

Disease Cycle and Epidemiology

This pathogen can survive as deep as 45 cm in the soil. It will survive in the soil as a type of spore, pycnidia, in plant roots, or plant debris of susceptible disease. Seed can not be infected. The root tips of onions are penetrated directly by hyphae. Colonies of the fungus will grow on the root or a few centimeter away from the root tip. The fungus will extend throughout the root system, but the pathogen does not infect the basal stem plate or scales of the bulb. Ideal soil temperature for this pathogen and development of the disease is 24-28 degrees Celsius. Yield losses are greatest when plants are infected early in the season resulting in a poor root system that cannot keep up with water uptake during hot temperatures.

Pink Root 
Pink Root is a plant disease that is caused by the fungal pathogen Pyrenochaeta terrestris.

Symptoms 
Roots will become infected and at first be light pink, sometimes they can be yellow or a yellow-brownish color. As the disease progresses the roots will become a darker pink then red and lastly turn to purple the advanced stages of this disease. Also in the later stages of this disease roots can become transparent, water soaked, and eventually disintegrate. New roots that form will also become infected, turn pink, and then die. Leaf size and number will be reduced, and bulbing will start early in infected plants compared to non-infected. Seedlings that become infected can be killed. Plants that survive from this disease become stunted and undersized which makes them not marketable. Plants that survive the infection will produce seed with a lowered biomass and germination rate.

Disease Management/Control 
One of the best ways to control this disease is to use a crop rotation. It is suggested to rotate planting onion every 3–6 years with crops that are not susceptible to Pyrenochaeta terrestris. This will reduce but not completely eliminate the primary inoculum source. Planting cultivars of onion that are resistant to the Pyrenochaeta terrestris pathogen is a very effective management strategy that should be used in all commercial operations. 

Another method of management is soil solarization. This method has shown to be effective in areas like the San Joaquin Valley, where onions are planted in fall after a summer fallow period.

"Fumigation with metam sodium or chloropicrin can be effective against some strains of the fungus, but its effects can vary. Fumigation is also not always economical unless a high value seed crop is being grown."

Management practices such as decreasing the irrigation interval have been shown to increase yield in Sudan as well.

Studies done in 1997 showed promising results for resistant cultivars. At the seedling stage they were entirely resistant and then began to show signs of a reduced infection towards maturity.

References

External links 
 Index Fungorum
 USDA ARS Fungal Database

Fungal plant pathogens and diseases
Maize diseases
Root vegetable diseases
Fungal strawberry diseases
Fungi described in 1948
Pleosporales